Shin Woo-chul is a South Korean television director. He is best known as the director of the trilogy Lovers (2004-07) created by Kim Eun-sook.

Other works include On Air (2008), The City Hall (2009), the hit drama Secret Garden (2010), A Gentleman's Dignity (2012), Gu Family Book (2013), and the international hits Where Stars Land (2018) and Melting Me Softly (2019).

Filmography

Television

Awards

References

External links
 

Living people
1966 births
South Korean television directors